Luca Tomasig (originally Tomašić, born 11 March 1983) is an Italian footballer who plays as a goalkeeper.

Career
Tomasig started his senior career for Pozzuolo, then Belluno of Serie D. In summer 2003, he was signed by Belluno in co-ownership deal with Atalanta.

He joined Cagliari in January 2005 in co-ownership, in exchange with Davide Capello on loan, but he left for Padova in January 2006.

In August 2006 he terminated his contract with club and joined Catanzaro. In August 2007, he joined Reggiana. Tomasig became the first choice in 2009–10 season.

On 26 July 2010, he left for Serie B side AlbinoLeffe which the club seek for a reliable keeper, for €10,000. In exchange, Daniel Offredi was sent to Reggiana  on loan. On 21 June 2011 AlbinoLeffe bought half of the registration rights of Tomasig for €90,000. On 24 June 2012 Tomasig returned to Reggio Emilia, for just €1,250

On 2 September 2013 Tomasig was signed by Serie B side Novara Calcio.

Honours
Belluno
Serie D Group C: 2003

References

External links
reggianacalcio.it

aic.football.it

Italian footballers
A.C. Belluno 1905 players
Cagliari Calcio players
Calcio Padova players
U.S. Catanzaro 1929 players
A.C. Reggiana 1919 players
U.C. AlbinoLeffe players
Novara F.C. players
Serie B players
Association football goalkeepers
Italian Slovenes
People from Gorizia
1983 births
Living people
Footballers from Friuli Venezia Giulia